The Trudner Horn Nature Park is a nature reserve south of Bolzano in South Tyrol, Italy.

Flora
The Trudner Horn Nature Park is home to many variety of rare plant, like are species of pasque flower Pulsatilla, Primula, Leucojum vernum, Aquilegia einseleana, Achillea oxyloba, Artemisia mutellina, Lilium martagon and  Lilium bulbiferum, species of Orchidaceae (for example Cypripedium calceolus), Cyclamen purpurascens, Dictamnus albus, Dianthus carthusianorum, Armeria alpina, species of Gentiana, Iris pseudacorus, edelweiss Leontopodium alpinum, Ruscus aculeatus, alpine forget-me-not Eritrichium nanum, European white waterlily Nymphaea alba, Typha, spatterdock Nuphar lutea, Physoplexis comosa. In acidic bogs are growing Drosera and Pinguicula.

References

External links
Civic network of South Tyrol

Trudner Horn
Fiemme Mountains